Arzeh Khvoran (also Romanized as Arzeh Khvorān and Arzeh Khowrān; also known as Arzeh Khvorān-e Bozorg) is a village in Oryad Rural District, in the Central District of Mahneshan County, Zanjan Province, Iran. At the 2006 census, its population was 243, in 46 families.

References 

Populated places in Mahneshan County